Southern District Police Station is a historic police station located at Baltimore, Maryland, United States. It is a monumental Romanesque Revival steel-framed building faced in stone and brick constructed in 1896. The station is composed of a three-story cubic main block, a two-story rear ell, and two additions built in the 1950s that fill most of the remainder of the corner lot.

The building remained in use by the Baltimore Police Department until the mid-1980s, when it was sold to a local non-profit group.

Southern District Police Station was listed on the National Register of Historic Places in 2001.

References

External links
, including photo from 2001, at Maryland Historical Trust

Buildings and structures in Baltimore
Government buildings completed in 1896
Government buildings on the National Register of Historic Places in Baltimore
Infrastructure completed in 1896
Police stations on the National Register of Historic Places
South Baltimore, Baltimore
Baltimore Police Department